Sary-Tologoy is a village in the Tüp District of Issyk-Kul Region of Kyrgyzstan. Its population was 1,631 in 2021.

References

Populated places in Issyk-Kul Region